The Battle of Kassala was fought on July 17, 1894, between an Italian colonial troop and Mahdist Sudanese forces.

Prelude
Governor Oreste Baratieri sought to capture Kassala, to forestall Mahdist attacks on Eritrea. In July 1894, Baratieri saw his moment when the Atbarah River started to rise, and marched his small army of "56 Italian officers, 41 NCOs and 2510 native soldiers led by 16 Bukbashis" towards Kassala.

Battle
An account of the capture of Kassala was published in The New York Times on July 20, 1894:

" Rome, July 19.- ...The attack upon the earthworks of the Mahdists was at once ordered and a fiercely contested battle ensued. The Mahdists fought desperately, but were finally driven from their position, leaving hundreds of dead and wounded in and about the intrenchments. Being hotly pursued, the Mahdists scattered under a continuous fire, and many of them in their efforts to escape plunged into the River Adbara, hoping to reach the other side. ...Hundreds of the enemy were drowned, and it is believed that none succeeded in reaching the opposite bank."

Aftermath
The Italians captured two flags and a number of cannons, in addition the Italians freed captured people, including
"several white men and about a hundred of the remnants of the former Egyptian garrison; also a number from the tribes around."

On July 23 the General Oreste Baratieri left, leaving a garrison of a thousand men with two guns under Colonel Turitto.
Three years later, in 1897,  the Italians gave control of Kassala back to the British, returning to their Italian Eritrea, in order to get international recognition of their colony of Eritrea.

Sources

1894 in Sudan
Kassala
Kassala
Kassala
Kassala
July 1894 events